Glipa laosensis is a species of beetle in the genus Glipa. It was described in 1922.

References

laosensis
Beetles described in 1922